The 1989 CFL Draft composed of eight rounds where 64 Canadian football players were chosen from eligible Canadian universities and Canadian players playing in the NCAA.

1st round

2nd round

3rd round
17. Ottawa Rough Riders            Sean Foudy          TB         York

18.Calgary Stampeders          Louie Cafazzo       DE        Western Ontario

19. Hamilton Tiger-Cats            Wayne Drinkwalter   LB        Thunder Bay Giants

20. Calgary Stampeders             Richard McCrory     T         Concordia

21. Edmonton Eskimos               Derek Schumann      S         Bishop's

22. Toronto Argonauts              Dave Kinzie        DE         Bowling Green

23. British Columbia Lions         Matt Pearce        FB           British Columbia

24. Winnipeg Blue Bombers          Bertrand Joyel     TE           Bishop's

4th round
25. Ottawa Rough Riders            Tom Schimmer       P            Boise State

26. Calgary Stampeders             Sroko Zizakovic    LB           Ohio State

27. Hamilton Tiger-Cats            Mark Brus          TB           Tulsa

28. Calgary Stampeders             Brent Pollock      T            Fresno State

29. Edmonton Eskimos               Louis Olsacher     G            Saint Mary's

30. Toronto Argonauts              Mike Cote          T            Colgate

31. British Columbia Lions         Rohan Dove        CB            Wilfrid Laurier

32. Winnipeg Blue Bombers          Matt Pearce       FB            British Columbia

5th round
33. Ottawa Rough Riders            Nenad Radulovich  T             Western Ontario

34. Calgary Stampeders             Harald Hasselbach DT            Washington

35. Hamilton Tiger-Cats            Steve Blyth       DT           San Diego State

36. Saskatchewan Roughriders       Rob Zimmerman     FB            Calgary

37. Edmonton Eskimos               Brent Korte       DE           Alberta

38. Toronto Argonauts              Derrick Joseph    DT             Bishop's

39. British Columbia Lions         Pat Nield         LB             Guelph

40. Winnipeg Blue Bombers          Jeff Croonen      LB             Western Ontario

6th round
41. Ottawa Rough Riders            Trent Brown       DB             Alberta

42. Calgary Stampeders             Dave Mossman      S              Hawaii

43. Hamilton Tiger-Cats            Sam Loucks        TB             McMaster

44. Edmonton Eskimos               Shaun Gardiner    LB             Saskatchewan

45. Edmonton Eskimos               Rob Davidson  DT  Toronto

46. Toronto Argonauts              Roger Dietrich    DT             Simon Fraser

47. British Columbia Lions         Wayne England     LB             Guelph

48. Winnipeg Blue Bombers          Lance Scranton    T             Dickinson State

7th round
49. Ottawa Rough Riders            Gord Weber        LB            Ottawa

50. Calgary Stampeders             Travis Dunkle     DB              Calgary

51. Hamilton Tiger-Cats            Pete Buchanan     LB              Nebraska

52. Saskatchewan Roughriders       Kelly Trithart    LB              Saskatchewan

53. Edmonton Eskimos               Mike Hildebrand   DB              Calgary

54. Toronto Argonauts              Brian Beckles     C               Wilfrid Laurier

55. British Columbia Lions         Dave Shaw  LB  Waterloo

56. Winnipeg Blue Bombers          Paul Hitchcock   SB               Acadia

8th round
57. Ottawa Rough Riders             Bob Forest      LB               Carleton 

58. Calgary Stampeders             Brian Stiedle    T                Simon Fraser

59. Hamilton Tiger-Cats            Bill Scollard    P                Saint Mary's

60. Saskatchewan Roughriders       Greg Galan       QB               Saskatchewan

61. Edmonton Eskimos               Bruce McDonald  S  British Columbia

62. Toronto Argonauts              Dave Hjarr       LB               Carleton

63. British Columbia Lions         Mark Nykolaichuk TB               British Columbia

64. Winnipeg Blue Bombers          Ron Bresch       T                Manitoba

References

Canadian College Draft
Cfl Draft, 1989